The Late Late Show may refer to:

Music 
 The Late, Late Show (album), 1957 album by Dakota Staton
 "The Late, Late Show", a song by Roy Alfred and Murray Berlin, included on Staton's album
 Also recorded by Nat King Cole on the 1959 album Welcome to the Club (Nat King Cole album)

Television 
 The Late Late Show (Irish talk show), which started airing in 1962
 The Late Late Show (American talk show), on CBS which started airing in 1995:
 The Late Late Show with Tom Snyder (1995–1999)
 The Late Late Show with Craig Kilborn (1999–2004)
 The Late Late Show with Craig Ferguson (2005–2014)
 The Late Late Show with James Corden (2015–present)

See also 
 
 The Late Show (disambiguation)
 The Late, Late Breakfast Show, a BBC television light entertainment show broadcast from 1982 to 1986
 The Late, Late, Late Show, 1996 album by Frankenstein Drag Queens from Planet 13